Pontus Johan Tidemand (born 10 December 1990) is a Swedish rally and  rallycross driver. He is the 2017 WRC-2 champion and a previous M-Sport and Škoda Motorsport driver. Pontus is the son of Swedish rally driver Tomas Tidemand and ex-rally co-driver Maud Solberg, nowadays the wife of Norwegian rally driver Henning Solberg.

Career

He made his World Rally Championship début in 2012, competing in the WRC Academy. He finished third in the WRC Academy championship behind winner Elfyn Evans and José Antonio Suárez. He also competed that years Rally Sweden in the Super 2000 World Rally Championship, finishing third in the SWRC class. He made his World Rally Car début at the 2013 Rally Sweden in a Ford Fiesta RS WRC.

For 2014 he switched to rallycross, joining Mattias Ekström's new EKS RX team to drive an Audi S1 in the 2014 FIA World Rallycross Championship.

Racing record

WRC results

SWRC results

WRC Academy/JWRC results

WRC-2 results

Complete FIA European Rallycross Championship results

Supercar

Complete FIA World Rallycross Championship results

Supercar

References

External links

Official Website
Results at ewrc-results.com

1990 births
Living people
Swedish rally drivers
World Rally Championship drivers
European Rallycross Championship drivers
World Rallycross Championship drivers
Global RallyCross Championship drivers
Sportspeople from Värmland County
Toksport WRT drivers
M-Sport drivers
Škoda Motorsport drivers
European Rally Championship drivers